The White Mountain School, often called White Mountain or WMS, is a co-educational, independent boarding school located in Bethlehem, New Hampshire, United States. Established in 1886 as St. Mary's School in Concord, New Hampshire, the school moved to its current location in 1936, situated just north of the White Mountains of New Hampshire.

History
The White Mountain School was founded in 1886 as an all-girls Episcopal high school called St. Mary's School in Concord, New Hampshire. In 1935, Dorothy McLane, the school's headmistress, moved the school north into the White Mountains region, to the estate of Ernest Poole in Sugar Hill, New Hampshire; the school was then renamed St. Mary's-in-the-Mountains.  One year later in 1936, the school bought the Seven Springs Estate, in Bethlehem, New Hampshire, from Eman and Mary Payne Beck and relocated there for the last time. Over the next 25 years, the Bethlehem campus expanded with the purchase of new dormitories and the construction of new classroom wings. On January 3, 1964, the school's Main Building burned down. The following year, a new Main Building was constructed in its place. Six years later, in 1970, the school began accepting a small number of male day students, and in 1972 the school became co-educational and changed its name to the White Mountain School.

Academics
The White Mountain School curriculum is structured in a traditional liberal arts model. Each discipline offers a range of courses from introductory-level, Honors, Advanced Placement, to student-designed independent studies. Year-long courses are worth one credit; semester courses are worth ½ credit. To graduate, students must earn 19 academic credits, including a minimum of 4 credits in English, 2 ½ credits in history, 3 credits in mathematics, 3 credits in science, 2 credits in world language, 1 credit in the arts, ½ credit in philosophy and religious studies and ½ credit in sustainability studies. (The White Mountain School was the first high school in the US to add Sustainability Studies as an academic department.) In addition, students must complete two Field Courses per year and a LASR Project.

The White Mountain School Field Course is a week-long, academic exploration of a specific topic that occurs within an appropriate geographic setting. They occur in October and March for five days in length. Recent courses have included Poverty, Homelessness and Hunger (Portland, Maine), Adirondack Art and Adventure (New York), Island Culture and Ecology (Acadia National Park, Maine), Avalanche Forecasting (Wyoming & Idaho), A Walk in Thoreau's Shoes (Massachusetts), Gender & Politics: Women's Rights in the US (Washington, DC), Desert Ecology of the Southwest (Tucson, Arizona), Community Service Odyssey (Dominican Republic), Writing for Performance: Exploration of Performing Arts (New Hampshire), Buddhism (The Vermont Zen Center, Shelburne, Vermont), Green Living in the Urban World: Sustainability & Service (Montreal), Carving Up Equations to Carve the Slopes: The Math of Ski and Snowboard Design (Vermont & New Hampshire).

"LASR" in the White Mountain School LASR Project stands for the general categories that students can pursue: Leadership, Arts, Service and Research. Students choose from several approaches to completing the project, including (but not limited to) the following courses: Research Seminar, Art Portfolio, Independent Study, Senior Project, and Field Course Leadership.

Faculty and advisors
Every student has a faculty advisor who communicates with parents throughout the year and they serve as a primary liaison between student, family, and teacher. 67% of the faculty hold advanced degrees as well as a variety of additional certifications.

Student body
The White Mountain School enrolls 123 students from around the country and the world, 49% male and 51% female. 76% of the student population boards and 24% are day students from surrounding towns.

Campus
The school's  campus is located between the towns of Bethlehem and Littleton, New Hampshire on a hilltop providing views of the White Mountains. The McLane Academic Center houses the classroom wing, multimedia center and learning labs. The school library offers more than 7,000 volumes, an online catalog, several online databases, and an inter-library loan system with Dartmouth College and the University of New Hampshire. The Fred Steele Science Center is equipped with SMART Board interactive technology and state-of-the-art labs which allow for a wide range of independent projects. The new Catherine Houghton Arts Center houses dance, visual arts, and music studios. The school partners with Creative Edge Dance Studio to offer academic courses as well as technique and performance-based classes for students of all dance styles and levels. Students have access to these spaces and the practice studios and recording lab outside of class.

The  indoor Beverly S. Buder climbing wall is located inside an indoor sports center outfitted with Nautilus equipment, free weights and aerobic equipment. The campus also has two athletic fields, an extensive trail system, and a school farm, including a student-built post and beam shed; a chicken coop with hens; an organic vegetable and fruit garden; and composting bins. The student center is located in McLane.

Boarding students live in one of four dorms with their peers, faculty members and faculty families. Each dorm has common space with couches, a TV and a microwave. The dining hall serves breakfast, lunch, and dinner, and is available for drinks and light snacks all day.

On weekends, faculty offer a range of activities for students. Activities include outdoor outings such as moonlight hikes, ski trips or mountain bike riding; shopping trips to outlet centers, Burlington, or the local towns; art excursions to movies, plays, and art exhibits; campus sponsored cultural events, cookie baking in faculty kitchens and games.

Athletics and co-curricular activities
The White Mountain School is a member of the Lakes Region Athletic League of the New England Preparatory School Athletic Council. Activities include:

Adventure sports
All-mountain skiing and snowboarding
Ice climbing
Freestyle skiing and snowboarding
Mountain biking
Sport climbing
Outdoor rock climbing
Whitewater kayaking

Team sports
Cross-country
Cycling
Boys lacrosse
Girls lacrosse
Boys soccer
Girls soccer

Co-curricular activities
Dance
Farm and Forest
Robotics
Theater

The White Mountain School's rock climbing program was the first high school program to earn accreditation from the American Mountain Guides Association (AMGA). The sport climbing program partners with USA Climbing to provide multiple opportunities for competition. Students who choose to pursue outdoor sports learn the technical aspects of climbing and explore topics as minimum-impact travel, first aid, navigation, orienteering, trip planning, and natural history.

Costs and financial aid

Tuition, room and board for 2016-2017 is $57,900. Day student tuition is $29,000. Learning Center tutorials and the ESL Program have additional fees. 40% of students receive financial aid, with an average award of $40,000. Eligibility is based on need as established by School and Student Services (SSS) by National Association of Independent Schools.

Notable alumni

 Lucy Nettie Fletcher, WWI nurse
 Lucile Wheeler '52, Olympic skier, first North American to win a world title in the downhill event
 Audrey Thomas '53, novelist and short story writer, three time recipient of the Ethel Wilson Fiction Prize
 Will Gadd '85, renowned ice climber and paraglider pilot
 Parker Croft '05, film actor and screenwriter, known for Falling Overnight and Once Upon a Time (TV series)

External links 
 The White Mountain School

References

Educational institutions established in 1886
Preparatory schools in New Hampshire
Private high schools in New Hampshire
Schools in Grafton County, New Hampshire
Boarding schools in New Hampshire
Bethlehem, New Hampshire
1886 establishments in New Hampshire